Luis Basagaña Soto or Lluís (born 9 August 1963 in Andorra la Vella, Andorra) is an Andorran former footballer who last played for RCD Espanyol of the Spanish Primera División for the 1984-85 season. He is the first Andorran to have played in La Liga.

RCD Espanyol

Switching to RCD Espanyol of the Spanish top division for the 1984-85 season, Basagaña made his first-team debut on September 9, 1984, a 1-5 defeat to Valencia CF; that same day, the Association of Spanish Footballers went on striker and remonstrated against the Spanish Football Federation for various reasons.

He also featured in the Copa del Rey through his time with the club.

References 

1963 births
Living people
RCD Espanyol footballers
Andorran expatriate sportspeople in Spain
Andorran footballers
La Liga players
Andorran expatriate footballers
Expatriate footballers in Spain
Association football midfielders
CF Damm players